The Men's road time trial cycling events at the 2012 Summer Paralympics took place on September 5 at Brands Hatch.

Classification
Cyclists are given a classification depending on the type and extent of their disability. The classification system allows cyclists to compete against others with a similar level of function. The class number indicates the severity of impairment with "1" being most impaired.

Cycling classes are:
B: Blind and visually impaired cyclists use a Tandem bicycle with a sighted pilot on the front
H 1–4: Cyclists with an impairment that affects their legs use a handcycle
T 1–2: Cyclists with an impairment that affects their balance use a tricycle
C 1-5: Cyclists with an impairment that affects their legs, arms and/or trunk but are capable of using a standard bicycle

B

H1

H2

H3

H4

C1

C2

C3

C4

C5

References 

Men's road time trial